Danny Buxton (born 13 November 1977) is a British auto racing driver. In 1997 he won the Ford Fiesta championship, before finishing 3rd in the National Championship the following year. In 2000 he was runner up in the Renault Clio Cup, winning the championship a year later in 2001 with the TSM Developments Team. He drove in the championship for a third year in 2002 for Mardi Gras Motorsport, finishing 3rd with 4 race wins. 

In 2003 he got a drive in the British Touring Car Championship for the Vic Lee ran Team Halfords in a Touring Class Peugeot 307. He joined the season at the halfway point with his first race at round eleven at Croft. He replaced Carl Breeze who had gone to GA Motorsport. He finished 4th in the independents championship with 2 wins.

From 2011, Buxton and fellow former BTCC driver Tom Ferrier formed Scuderia Vittoria, and entered a team in both the AirAsia Renault Clio Cup (4x Renault Clio Cup Cars) and the British GT (1x Ginetta G55, 1x Ferrari 458 Italia GT). At the conclusion of the 2011 season, the team had achieved 14 wins over both classes, in their debut season.

Danny started working with McLaren Automotive in 2010, assisting on road car development. Then moved into the role as Head of the Professional Drive Team, before moving in October 2020 to Head of Customer Racing for McLaren Motorsport. His brother Will was also a racing driver. But today he works for F1TV

Racing record

Complete British Touring Car Championship results
(key) (Races in bold indicate pole position - 1 point awarded in first race) (Races in italics indicate fastest lap - 1 point awarded all races) (* signifies that driver lead race for at least one lap - 1 point awarded all races)

External links
 BTCC Pages Profile.

1977 births
Living people
British Touring Car Championship drivers
English racing drivers
Renault UK Clio Cup drivers